UWC Dilijan College is the 14th member of the United World Colleges movement, one of eighteen colleges around the world, and the first international boarding school in Armenia. The college matriculated its first 96 IB1 students (11th graders) in September 2014. Currently, the school offers IB Diploma years 1 and 2 (grades 11-12). The school now hosts 227 students and is planning to expand further.

A portion of the school is on the premises of Dilijan National Park.

Mission

UWC Dilijan is a community working towards a more peaceful, equitable and sustainable world through a balanced, challenging and transforming education with people from diverse backgrounds.

The mission of the UWC movement and of the school is to "make education a force to unite people, nations and cultures for peace and a sustainable future".

The college aims to be an integral part of Dilijan and to have positive personal, local and global impact.

It uses the International Baccalaureate (IB) Diploma Programme as its curriculum.

Governance and funding
UWC Dilijan evolved from the original idea to create Dilijan International School of Armenia, first conceived in 2006 by Ruben Vardanyan and Veronika Zonabend with the support of other founding patrons (Gagik Adibekyan from Russia, Noubar and Anna Afeyan from United States, Vladimir and Anna Avetissian from Russia and Oleg Mkrtchyan from Ukraine, as well as 4 anonymous patrons).

The college officially opened on 11 October 2014 for the 2014–2015 academic year, in the presence of the president of Armenia Serzh Sargsyan, the president of Serbia Tomislav Nikolić, Catholicos Karekin II of Armenia and Patriarch Mar Ignatius Aphrem II of the Syrian Orthodox Church.

The school is funded by a mix of large philanthropic giving and the support of over 500 donors. $26 million has been raised for scholarships, supporting 86% of students with either full or partial financial support, and $180 million has been contributed for capital and operational costs. Amal Clooney sponsors an annual scholarship for a young woman from Lebanon to attend UWC Dilijan; she and her husband have supported and visited the school.

Upon graduating, UWC Dilijan alum become a part of the Davis UWC Scholars Program, which helps fund their future studies within the United States.

Students 
On 28 May 2016, the first graduates of UWC Dilijan, 96 students from around 48 nations worldwide, completed two years of schooling and took part in the inaugural graduation ceremony.

In the academic year 2017-18 UWC Dilijan became home to 213 students from 82 countries. They continue their education in leading universities worldwide such as Yale University, Columbia University, University College London, ETH Zürich, the School of Oriental and African Studies (SOAS), The University of Toronto, McGill University,  Stanford University,  Brown University, The University of Chicago, Duke University, the Minerva Schools at KGI, Queen Mary University of London, the University of Warwick, The University of California, Berkeley, the University of Edinburgh, the University of Richmond, the University of Rochester, Bennington College and many more.

Gallery

See also 

United World Colleges
Tumo Center for Creative Technologies
Ayb School

References

External links
 
 UWC Dilijan Official Facebook Page
 UWC Movement website
 

International schools in Armenia
United World Colleges
Secondary schools in Armenia
Boarding schools in Armenia
International Baccalaureate schools in Armenia
Educational institutions established in 2014
2014 establishments in Armenia